is a Filipino judoka who participated at the 81 kg event at the 2016 Summer Olympics. He has also participated at the 2013 World Judo Championship in Rio de Janeiro and the 2013 Southeast Asian Games. Nakano won a bronze at the -81 kg event at the Southeast Asia Judo Championships in Napyidaw, Myanmar.

Nakano was born to a Japanese businessman from Tokyo who has a Filipina wife.

References

External links
 

1993 births
Filipino male judoka
Judoka at the 2016 Summer Olympics
Filipino people of Japanese descent
Living people
Olympic judoka of the Philippines
Sportspeople from Iwate Prefecture
Japanese people of Filipino descent